The 10th IKF World Korfball Championship were held in the Belgian cities of Ghent, Tielen and Antwerp in 2015. Ghent and Tielen hosted the first and second round matches, whilst the placing matches and finals were all held in the Lotto Arena in Antwerp.

This tournament also acts as the qualification tournament for Korfball at the World Games 2017. Seven teams will qualify for the World Games, including first all non-European teams finishing in the top 11. As such, at least one and maximum six non-European teams will qualify. Then, the remaining slots will be filled by the top European teams in this competition, with the exception of Poland which have already qualified as host country of the World Games 2017.

The International Korfball Federation chose to award the hosting rights for the tournament to Belgium on 4 November 2011. The other hosting candidate was New Zealand, who planned to host the tournament in Wellington.

Qualified teams

First round
All times listed are Central European Time (UTC+01)

The draw for the first round was made on 7 February 2015 and the matches will be played in Ghent and Tielen.

Pool A

Pool B

Pool C

Pool D

Second round
All times listed are Central European Time (UTC+01)

The top two teams of each group in the first round advanced to the pools for the top 8th places (pools E and F), while the other teams move into pools G and H which will determine positions 9 to 16. In each second round pool the top two will advance to a finals playoff for the top positions, with the bottom two teams dropping into the playoffs for the bottom positions. 
During the second round, all matches will still be played in Ghent and Tielen, but due to the tournament structure, all teams that played in Ghent in round 1 will now play in Tielen and vice versa.

Pools for 1st–8th places

Pool E

Pool F

Pools for 9th–16th places

Pool G

Pool H

Finals
All times listed are Central European Time (UTC+01)

The top two teams of pools E and F play the championship finals, while the other teams play for placing positions and possible qualification for the Korfball at the World Games 2017 tournament.
Note that from this round on, all matches are played in the Lotto Arena in Antwerp.

13th–16th places

Bracket

13th–16th position placing matches

15th–16th place match

13th–14th place match

9th–12th places

Bracket

9th–12th position placing matches

11th–12th place match

9th–10th place match

5th–8th places

Bracket

5th–8th position placing matches

7th–8th place match

5th–6th place match

Championship semifinals

Bracket

Semifinals

3rd–4th place match

Final

Statistics

New record
 Jesse de Bremaeker of Belgium scored 14 goals against Russia on 31 October 2015, tying the record for most goals by a single player in a match during the IKF World Korfball Championship, early set by Barry Schep.
 Belgium won against Brazil by 62–15 on 1 November 2015, which is the new world record for most total goals in one match and most goals by a single team in one match in IKF World Korfball Championship. The previous record was set during the 2011 IKF World Korfball Championship, when Netherlands beat India by 61–11.

Final standings

See also
Korfball World Championship
International Korfball Federation

Notes

References

External links
International Korfball Federation

Korfball World Championship
Korfball World Championship
IKF World Korfball Championship
International sports competitions hosted by Belgium
Korfball in Belgium